Blanter is a Russian-Jewish surname.

Notable people
Notable people with this surname include:
 Matvey Blanter (1903–1990), Russian composer
 Yaroslav Blanter (born 1967), Russian physicist

References

Russian-Jewish surnames